The twenty-first season of the American crime-drama television series Law & Order: Special Victims Unit premiered on Thursday September 26, 2019 on NBC and concluded on April 23, 2020. This made the series the longest-running U.S. prime-time drama in history. The season is produced by Wolf Films and Universal Television; the showrunner being Warren Leight.

This season is the first not to feature Philip Winchester as Peter Stone since his introduction in the nineteenth season, following his departure at the conclusion of the previous season.

On March 13, 2020, the production of the twenty-first season was suspended due to the COVID-19 pandemic in the United States. Twenty out of the original twenty-four episode order were completed before production was suspended. The twentieth episode served as the season finale.

Cast

Main
 Mariska Hargitay as Lieutenant / Captain Olivia Benson
 Kelli Giddish as Senior Detective Amanda Rollins
 Ice-T as Senior Detective Sergeant Odafin "Fin" Tutuola
 Peter Scanavino as Assistant District Attorney Dominick "Sonny" Carisi, Jr.
 Jamie Gray Hyder as Officer Katriona "Kat" Tamin

Recurring

 Peter Gallagher as Deputy Chief William Dodds
 Jenna Stern as Defense Attorney Elana Barth
 Zuleikha Robinson as Bureau Chief Assistant District Attorney Vanessa Hadid
 Edelen McWilliams as Crime Scene Unit Technicain Martin
 Yvonna Kopacz-Wright as Dr. Darby Wilder
 Amy Hargreaves as Dr. Alexis Hanover
 Ryan Buggle as Noah Porter-Benson
 Ernest Waddell as Ken Randall
 Demore Barnes as Deputy Chief Christian Garland
 Stephen Wallem as Nurse Rudy Syndergaard
 Erica Camarano as Officer Rachel Ortiz
 Joseph Lyle Taylor as Defense Attorney Mickey D’Angelo
 Stephen C. Bradbury as Judge Colin McNamara
 Peter Hermann as Defense Attorney Trevor Langan
 Olga Merediz as Judge Roberta Martinez
 Betsy Aidem as Dr. Sloane
 Ami Brabson as Judge Karyn Blake
 Charlotte Cabell & Vivian Cabell as Jesse Rollins
 Tamara Tunie as Chief Medical Examiner Melinda Warner
 Michael Weston as Simon Marsden
 Ashley Taylor Greaves as Officer Gabrielle Taylor

 Erin Anderson as Defense Attorney April Andrews
 Matt Buechele as Officer Donnie Jones
 Marisa Brau-Reyes as Defense Attorney Edwina Myerson
 Sonia Manzano as Judge Gloria Pepitone
 Michael Tow as Defense Attorney Josh Wang
 Jeffrey Schecter as Defense Attorney Art Blumfeld 
 Nicholas Turturro as Detective Frank Bucci
 Aida Turturro as Judge Felicia Catano
 Tom Coiner as Officer Chuck Inslow 
 Robert John Burke as Captain Ed Tucker
 Michael Mastro as Judge Serani
 Jeremy Russial as Defense Attorney Robert Kluger
 Delaney Williams as Defense Attorney John Buchanan
 Ari'el Stachel as Sergeant Hasim Khaldun 
 Lauren Biazzo as Detective Marina Cruz
 Marissa Matrone as Judge Maria Ana DeFeceo
 Lindsay Pulsipher as Kim Rollins
 Kecia Lewis as Judge Constance Copeland
 Vincent Curatola as Judge Al Bertuccio
 Lou Martini Jr. as Defense Attorney Ron Freddo
 Jasmin Walker as Defense Attorney Marame Touissant
 Mouzam Makkar as Defense Attorney Dara Miglani

Guest
On July 9, 2019, it was announced Jenna Stern would reprise her role as Elana Barth in the season premiere. On July 13, 2019, Leight revealing that Peter Gallagher would also reprise his role as Deputy Chief William Dodds in the first episode of the season. Ian McShane guest-starred in the season premiere, as "a charming and high-profile media mogul who takes on Olivia Benson and the SVU squad after being accused of sexual assault". On July 30, 2019, it was announced that Ariel Winter would guest star in the second episode of the season, titled "The Darkest Journey Home". On August 23, 2019, it was announced that Amy Hargreaves would recur as Dr. Alexis Hanover, a psychologist tasked with teaching the team a new technique, which requires each of them to recall past traumas from their own lives. On October 4, 2019, it was confirmed that Demore Barnes would recur as the new Deputy Chief of SVU Christian Garland, who is described as intelligent and analytical and immediately makes an impression on the detectives during his first case. Margaret Cho appeared in the seventh episode of the season, titled "Counselor It's Chinatown", as a massage-parlor manager swept up in a sex-trafficking sting operation.

Episodes

Production

Development
Law & Order: Special Victims Unit was renewed for a twenty-first season on March 29, 2019. Production for the season started on July 9, 2019. On April 23, 2019, it was announced Warren Leight, who was showrunner for the series' thirteenth-seventeenth seasons, would return to the series as showrunner, while Michael S. Chernuchin would become showrunner for another Dick Wolf show, FBI. On July 9, 2019, Leight posted a photo on Twitter revealing the first episode's title "I'm Going to Make You a Star". On November 4, 2019, it was announced that Jamie Gray Hyder would be promoted to main cast as Detective-in-training Katriona Tamin from the eighth episode. Hyder had a recurring role from the start of the season.

Special
An hour-long retrospective, The Paley Center Salutes Law & Order: SVU, aired on January 2, 2020.

Ratings

References

21
2019 American television seasons
2020 American television seasons
Television productions suspended due to the COVID-19 pandemic